Saint Julian of Le Mans (3rd century; perhaps 4th century) is a saint venerated in both the Roman Catholic and Orthodox Church, honored as the first bishop of Le Mans. His feast day is 27 January.  The translation of his relics is celebrated on 25 July.

Life

It is reported that he may have been a Roman nobleman, but he was also identified with Simon the Leper or as one of the seventy-two disciples of Christ, in keeping with attempts to claim an apostolic origin for the see.

He was consecrated a bishop at Rome and around the middle of the 3rd century, Julian was sent to Gaul, along with the priest Thuribe and the deacon Pavace, to preach the Gospel to the tribe of the Cenomani. Their capital city was Civitas Cenomanorum (Le Mans), which was suffering from a shortage of drinking water.  According to the legends surrounding his life, Julian thrust his staff into the ground and prayed.  Water began to gush out of the ground.  This miracle allowed him to preach freely within Le Mans.  The city's principal citizen was converted to Christianity along with his family, donating to the Church part of his palace to serve as Le Mans' first cathedral church.

Julian converted many other citizens and Le Mans' new bishop cared for the poor, the infirm, and the orphans.  His miracles included the resurrection of a dead man.

Upon reaching old age, he retired to live as a hermit at Sarthe.

Veneration

The Cathédrale St-Julien, in Le Mans, is dedicated to him.

The feast of St. Julian of Le Mans was celebrated in England because Henry II of England had been born in Le Mans. His feast was kept throughout the south of England in at least nine Benedictine English monasteries. The Church of St. Julian in Norwich is likely dedicated to him. Having rested in a shrine at the Benedictine convent of Notre-Dame-du-Pre since the Middle Ages, most of his relics were burnt or scattered by the Huguenots in 1562. Julian's head is still shown at the cathedral of Le Mans, where it has been since 1254.

References

External links
Catholic Online: Julian of Le Mans
Catholic Forum: Julian of Le Mans
San Giuliano di Le Mans

3rd-century deaths
Bishops of Le Mans
3rd-century Christian saints
Le Mans
French hermits
3rd-century bishops in Gaul
Gallo-Roman saints
Year of birth unknown